Davey Lake is a lake of Saskatchewan, Canada.

See also
List of lakes in Saskatchewan

References
Statistics Canada
Anglersatlas.com

Lakes of Saskatchewan